Alfred Wilhelm Carl Weidler (27 May 1886, Georgsmarienhütte, Germany – 16 June 1966, Los Angeles) was an architect who, after moving from Germany to Los Angeles in 1923, went on to become a prolific model builder for 40 years with 20th Century Fox.

Early career
The impetus for Weidler moving his family to America, arriving 1923, came at the collapse of the German mark after World War I. He had been in the German Army Engineering Corps during World War I. After the war, he became the city architect for Hamburg and started a family with his wife.  By 1939, Weidler had made more than 500 models for Hollywood sets, large and small.  And he was the author of correspondence courses in modelmaking. The Weidler Studio was at 4589 Lexington Avenue, Hollywood, California.

Family

He was married in 1917 in Berlin to a former Wagnerian opera singer, Margarete Therese Louise (née Radon; 1890–1987), later known as Margaret Weidler. They had six children, the first four (Waldtraud, Verena, Werther, and Wolfgang). Waldtraud, later known as Sylvia (1919–2003), was a child actress who appeared in the 1930 film, What a Widow!.

The youngest daughter, Virginia (1927–1968), flourished as a child actress. Sons George (1926–1989), Werther (later known as Warner), and Wolfgang (later known as Walter), were musicians. George, the second youngest child, was a well-known big band saxophonist and composer, whose first marriage was to Doris Day.

Selected publications
 Creative painting without a brush a course of instructions to produce original pictures and idea sketches; a new method of designing by controlled visualization, develops creative imagination, broad conception, speed, by Alfred Weidler (1943) 
 Scenic Master Stencil, by Charles William Alfred Weidler (1943)
 Varistencil Art: Art for everybody, A course of instruction to produce original paintings and idea sketches. A new method of designing by controlled visualization. Develops creative imagination, broad conception, speed.  Augmented and improved edition, Vol. 36, Issue 1, (1945)

Affiliations
 Member, Architects League of Hollywood

References

20th-century American architects
1886 births
1966 deaths
American scenic designers
People from Greater Los Angeles
German emigrants to the United States